Ole Erik Gunnar Petersen (born 30 December 1934, in Frederiksberg) is a sailor from Denmark. Petersen represented his country at the 1960 Summer Olympics in Naples. Petersen took Silver in the Danish Flying Dutchman Skum with Hans Fogh as helmsman. Petersen returned to the Olympic regatta in 1964 Summer Olympics in Enoshima. This time, again with Hans Fogh as helmsman he  took 4th place in the Flying Dutchman Miss Danmark 1964.

References

Living people
1934 births
Sportspeople from Frederiksberg
Danish male sailors (sport)
Sailors at the 1960 Summer Olympics – Flying Dutchman
Sailors at the 1964 Summer Olympics – Flying Dutchman
Olympic sailors of Denmark
Olympic medalists in sailing
Medalists at the 1960 Summer Olympics
Olympic silver medalists for Denmark